James Franklin Short Jr. (June 22, 1924 – May 13, 2018) was an American sociologist.

Biography
Born on June 22, 1924, James Franklin Short Jr. was raised on a farm near Pleasant Plains, Illinois. His father was a teacher. Short Jr. served in the United States Marine Corps before completing his doctorate in sociology at the University of Chicago, where he became known for his work with Fred Strodtbeck. He joined the faculty of Washington State University upon graduation in 1951, and retired in 1997. He was editor of the American Sociological Review from 1972 to 1975, awarded a Guggenheim Fellowship in 1975, and served as president of the American Sociological Association in 1984. Short died at the age of 93 on May 13, 2018.

References

1924 births
2018 deaths
Presidents of the American Sociological Association
Academic journal editors
American sociologists
Washington State University faculty
United States Marines
University of Chicago alumni
People from Sangamon County, Illinois
Military personnel from Illinois
American Sociological Review editors